After the General Elections held in December 1984 the Governor appointed M.G. Ramachandran as Chief Minister  heading the new Government on 10 February 1985 and appointed 16 more Ministers on 14 February 1985.

Cabinet ministers

References 

All India Anna Dravida Munnetra Kazhagam
Tamil Nadu ministries
1980s in Tamil Nadu
1985 establishments in Tamil Nadu
1987 disestablishments in India
Cabinets established in 1985
Cabinets disestablished in 1987